The 1987 edition of The Winston was a stock car racing competition that took place on May 17, 1987. Held at Charlotte Motor Speedway in Concord, North Carolina, the 135-lap race was an exhibition race in the 1987 NASCAR Winston Cup Series. Bill Elliott of Melling Racing won the pole and led the most laps (121), but it was Dale Earnhardt of Richard Childress Racing who won the race in a move that would be known in NASCAR history as the Pass in the Grass.

This was Tim Richmond's second and final appearance in The Winston. Despite being eligible for the 1988 Winston, he opted not to participate due to a then-ongoing lawsuit against NASCAR after he was suspended for testing positive for banned substances early that year. He died of complications from AIDS on August 13, 1989.

Background

The Winston was open to race winners from last season through the 1987 Winston 500 at Talladega Superspeedway, including the 1986 Atlanta Invitational. Because the field did not meet the minimum requirement of 19 cars, the remaining spots were awarded to the most recent winning drivers prior to the 1986 season.

1987 The Winston drivers and eligibility

Race winners in 1986 and 1987
3-Dale Earnhardt (11 wins from 1986 and 1987)
5-Geoff Bodine (2 wins in 1986, including the 1986 Daytona 500)
8-Bobby Hillin Jr. (1 win in 1986)
9-Bill Elliott (3 wins from 1986 and 1987, including the 1987 Daytona 500)
11-Terry Labonte (1 win in 1986)
15-Ricky Rudd (3 wins from 1986 and 1987)
17-Darrell Waltrip (3 wins in 1986)
21-Kyle Petty (1 win in 1986)
22-Bobby Allison (1 win in 1986)
25-Tim Richmond (7 wins in 1986)
26-Morgan Shepherd (1 win in 1986)
27-Rusty Wallace (2 wins in 1986)
28-Davey Allison (1 win in 1987)
75-Neil Bonnett (1 win in 1986)

1986 Atlanta Invitational winner
55-Benny Parsons

Race winners from previous years, not eligible by the above criteria
29-Cale Yarborough (2 wins in 1985)
33-Harry Gant (3 wins in 1985)
43-Richard Petty (2 wins in 1984)
50-Greg Sacks (1 win in 1985)

Winner of The Winston Open
88-Buddy Baker

Race summary

Segment 1
Buddy Baker made the starting grid by winning the Winston Open. Cale Yarborough served as the onboard camera car throughout the race. On the first lap, Dale Earnhardt and Geoff Bodine got loose and tangled with each other, with Earnhardt slightly hitting the turn three wall and both cars losing several positions in the process. Earnhardt eventually inched his way towards the top-five throughout the race. On lap 62, Neil Bonnett and Richard Petty collided in turn three, bringing out the first caution and ending their chances of finishing the race. Segment 1 ended on lap 76 with Elliott in first place.

Segment results
9-Bill Elliott ($25,000)
5-Geoff Bodine
17-Darrell Waltrip

Segment 2
Baker retired on lap 95 due to a transmission failure while Harry Gant suffered engine problems on lap 121. Segment 2 ended on lap 126, with Elliott once again on the top spot.

Segment results
9-Bill Elliott ($50,000)
3-Dale Earnhardt
5-Geoff Bodine

Segment 3
As Segment 3 began, Bodine attempted to pass in front of Elliott, but both cars tangled with Bodine spinning while Earnhardt took over the lead before the caution came out. With eight laps to go, Elliott closed in on Earnhardt and tapped him from behind. Earnhardt was sent to the infield grass, but he quickly recovered to maintain the lead in what has become known as the "pass in the grass". Both cars once again traded paint side-by-side, but the contact cut Elliott's left rear tire, forcing him to pit and go a lap down while Terry Labonte charged forward to challenge Earnhardt. Eventually, Earnhardt beat Labonte and Tim Richmond to win The Winston and earn $200,000.

Following the race, a frustrated Elliott bumped Earnhardt before all cars returned to pit road and Earnhardt entered victory lane.

Aftermath
NASCAR fined Earnhardt and Elliott $10,000 each for aggressive driving, with $7,500 being returned over the next seven weeks for good behavior. Geoff Bodine was fined $5,000 with $4,000 being returned over the next seven weeks for good behavior. Elliott and Earnhardt later made up, with Elliott issuing a public apology and accepting the penalty. On May 27, 1987, a fan sent NASCAR President Bill France Jr. a letter threatening to kill Earnhardt at Pocono, Watkins Glen, or Dover. NASCAR immediately handed over the letter to the FBI, who provided security for Earnhardt on all three tracks. The investigation was closed after the races on the three tracks finished with no incident.

References

Winston, The
Winston, The
NASCAR races at Charlotte Motor Speedway
NASCAR All-Star Race